In business and investing, term microcap stock (also micro-cap) refers to the stock of public companies in the United States which have a market capitalization of roughly $50 million to $300 million. The shares of companies with a market capitalization of less than $50 million are typically referred to as nano-cap stocks. Many micro-cap and nano-cap stocks are traded over-the-counter with their prices quoted on the OTCBB, OTC Link LLC, or the Pink Sheets. The larger, more established micro-caps are listed on the NASDAQ Capital Market or American Stock Exchange (AMEX).

This is true in the US, but by contrast—in Australia, for example—nano-cap companies are commonly listed on the Australian Securities Exchange (ASX).

Microcap stocks are in many ways different from other stocks since they are from companies with a small market capitalization and are usually traded on stock exchanges that do not require minimum standards, such as a minimum amount of net assets or a minimum number of stock holders. In addition, these micro cap stock companies often have fewer resources to make their information available to the public. These micro cap stocks are less likely to be published and talked about by stockbrokers compared to larger public companies. Often, microcap stock companies will specialize in innovative products or services that may be unknown to the general public. In Australia, many of them are junior mining explorers.

Micro-cap and especially nano-cap stocks can sometimes experience volatility. Some of these companies fail to execute their business plans and go out of business. Fraud and market manipulation are not uncommon and the transaction costs in trading can be quite high. Pricing is more likely to be inefficient, since fewer institutional investors and analysts operate in this space, due to the relatively small dollar amounts involved and the lack of liquidity—in other words, how many trades are made per day. 

Investors and finance experts have proposed microcaps can be good investments. David Maley of Ariel Investments argues that ample evidence indicates holding a portion of a portfolio in micro-cap stocks can offer advantages.  Micro-caps as a group tend to out-perform stocks from larger companies over time, Daley notes, and micro-caps are not closely correlated with larger company stocks or index funds and thus potentially offset broader market volatility. Furthermore, micro-caps being relatively neglected by analysts offers more potential opportunities for value investors. Similarly, professor Jeremy J. Siegel of Wharton School of Business notes in his book Stocks for the Long Run how a review of American stock data from 1926 to 1996 found that the smallest quintile of stocks by capitalization (including micro-caps) outperformed the largest quintile by an average of almost 4% per year. But this over-performance was not consistent, with multi-year stretches of time when smaller company stocks under-performed relative to larger company stock.

See also
Market manipulation
Microcap stock fraud
Penny stock

References

Stock market